Babylon Fortress is an Ancient Roman fortress, built around 30 BC with the arrival of emperor Augustus in Egypt, on the eastern bank of the Nile Delta, located in the area known today as Coptic Cairo. It is situated in the former area of the Heliopolite Nome, upon the east bank of the Nile, at latitude 30°N, near the commencement of the Pharaonic Canal (also called Ptolemy's Canal and Trajan's Canal), from the Nile to the Red Sea. 
 
It was at the boundary between Lower and Middle Egypt, where the river craft paid tolls when ascending or descending the Nile. Diodorus ascribes the erection of the first fort to rebel Assyrian captives in the reign of Sesostris, and Ctesias dates it to the time of Semiramis; but Josephus, with greater probability, attributes its structure to some Babylonian followers of Cambyses, in 525 BC. The Romans built a new fortress nearer the river, with typically Roman red and white banded masonry.

Within the fortress's enclosure are the Coptic Museum, a convent, and several churches, including the Church of St. George and the Hanging Church.

Name

Babylon was originally the dominant city of Mesopotamia. According to Egyptologists the ancient name of modern Babylon area in Cairo is Kheriaha, although Spiegelberg derives the modern Babylon name from Perhabinon.

Situation
Babylon lay northeast of Memphis, on the east bank of the Nile, at latitude 30° N, and near the commencement of the Canal of the Pharaohs connecting the Nile to the Red Sea. It was the boundary town between Lower and Middle Egypt, where the river craft paid tolls when ascending or descending the Nile.

During an uprising, Babylonian prisoners established a stronghold between Memphis and Heliopolis, on an elevation on the east bank of the Nile. Persians and Romans later garrisoned the fortress with their troops. Because of water delivery problems, the Roman Emperor Trajan relocated the fort to its present location, which at that time was nearer to the river.

Roman and Byzantine era
In the age of Augustus the Deltaic Babylon became a town of some importance, and was the headquarters of the three legions which ensured the obedience of Egypt. In the Notitia Imperii, Babylon is mentioned as the quarters of Legio XIII Gemina. Ruins of the town and fortress are still visible a little to the north of Fostat or Old Cairo, among which are vestiges of the Great Aqueduct mentioned by Strabo and the early Arabian topographers.

The town was the seat of a Christian bishopric, a suffragan of Leontopolis, the capital and metropolitan see of the Roman province of Augustamnica Secunda. The names of several of its bishops are recorded. After the Council of Chalcedon (451), some are of those who accepted the council, but most are of those who rejected it. No longer a residential bishopric, Babylon is today listed by both the Eastern Orthodox Church and the Catholic Church as a titular see.

During the Eastern Roman Empire period the city revolted against the rule of its emperor, Phocas.

Muslim conquest and early rule
During the Muslim conquest of Egypt the Byzantine fortress held out for about seven months before finally falling in December 640 to the Arab general 'Amr ibn al-'As. The history of this conquest, and of the subsequent rule of the then still Coptic Christian city by the Arabs, is told by John Bishop of Nikiû in his Chronicle, which survives now only in Ethiopic manuscripts.

Photographs

References

Bibliography

Richard Talbert, Barrington Atlas of the Greek and Roman World,, p. 74.
 Karelin, Dmitry A. The Reconstruction of the Diocletianic Fortress in Babylon of Egypt: Architectural Decorations and Details. Actual Problems of Theory and History of Art: Collection of articles. Vol. 9. Ed: A. V. Zakharova, S. V. Maltseva, E. Iu. Staniukovich-Denisova. Lomonosov Moscow State University / St. Petersburg: NP-Print, 2019, pp. 180–188. ISSN 2312-2129. 

Roman legionary fortresses in Egypt
Roman fortifications in Egypt
Old Cairo
Coptic Cairo
Castles in Egypt
Achaemenid Egypt